Fairmont Hotels & Resorts is a global chain of luxury hotels that operates more than 70 properties worldwide, with a strong presence in Canada.

The company originated from two hotel businesses established in the late 19th century, the Canadian Pacific Limited-owned Canadian Pacific Hotels & Resorts, and Fairmont Hotels. In 1999, Canadian Pacific Hotels acquired a majority interest in Fairmont Hotels; with Canadian Pacific Hotels later renaming its entire hotel portfolio under the Fairmont Hotels & Resorts banner in 2001. Shortly after the hotel division was renamed, Canadian Pacific Limited was split into several smaller companies in a starburst move, with Fairmont becoming a separately-traded company.

In 2006, Fairmont was acquired by Colony Capital, who subsequently entered into a joint partnership with the Kingdom Holding Company; consolidating Fairmont with their other hotel brands, Raffles and Swissôtel to form Fairmont Raffles Hotels International (FRHI). FRHI in turn became a subsidiary of AccorHotels in 2016.

History

Predecessors (1886–1999)

Canadian Pacific Hotels

Canadian Pacific Hotels (CP Hotels) began as a division of the Canadian Pacific Railway (CPR) Hotels department. The division operated a series of hotels along CPR's rail lines as early as 1886. Many of these resort hotels were built and operated by the railway's hotel department, while a few were later acquired from Canadian National Hotels, a hotel division of the Canadian National Railway. Over the years, a collection of grand railway hotels was put together throughout Canada, both rural and urban. By the 1980s, CP Hotels' collection included the Chateau Lake Louise, the Banff Springs Hotel, the Château Frontenac, the Empress Hotel, the Palliser Hotel, the Fairmont Royal York, and others. In addition to its properties in Canada, the hotel chain operated a few hotels outside Canada, with properties in Germany, Israel, Mexico, and the United States.

CPR's rival Grand Trunk Railway and later Canadian National Railway copied Van Horne's approach by building hotels such as the Jasper Park Lodge in Jasper, Alberta, and the Château Laurier in Ottawa. CPR purchased Canadian National Hotels, Canadian National Railway's hotel division in 1988, making CP Hotels the nation's largest hotel owner. In the 1990s, CP Hotels began to expand and purchased the Canadian Delta Hotels chain and the international Princess Hotels chain in 1998, which became wholly owned subsidiaries of CP Hotels. In 1999, the CP Hotels purchased the San Francisco-based Fairmont Hotels and Resorts chain.

Fairmont Hotels
During the 1890s, James Graham Fair bought the land where the Fairmont San Francisco now stands, the first hotel to bear the Fairmont namesake. The nearly completed structure survived the earthquake of 1906. Although heavily damaged by the subsequent fires, the hotel was renovated under the eye of architect Julia Morgan and finally opened in 1907. In 1926, the Penthouse Suite was created with three secret passageways to access it. 

In 1945, the Fairmont San Francisco was acquired by Benjamin Swig. Beginning in the 1960s, the Swig family developed Fairmont into a small chain of luxury hotels throughout the United States. Operating as Fairmont Hotels Management, the hotel chain acquired, and built a number of hotel properties. The chain acquired the Roosevelt Hotel in New Orleans in 1965, renaming it the Fairmont Roosevelt, and then Fairmont New Orleans. The Fairmont San Jose was opened by the hotel chain in 1987. The company assumed management of the Plaza Hotel in New York in 1995 and purchased the Copley Plaza Hotel in 1996, renaming it The Fairmont Copley Plaza Hotel. By 1998, the company managed seven properties in the United States.

In addition to those properties, the company also operated the Colony Square Hotel in Atlanta as Fairmont Colony Square Hotel from its opening in 1974 to 1977, and The Bellevue-Stratford Hotel in Philadelphia as Fairmont Philadelphia from 1979 to 1980.

Merger (1999–2001)
In April 1999, Canadian Pacific Hotels, Kingdom Hotels International and Maritz Wolff & Co. bought Fairmont Hotels Management L.P., with Canadian Pacific Hotels holding the majority of the shares (67%).

In 2001, Canadian Pacific Limited, the parent company of both Canadian Pacific Hotels and Resorts, and Canadian Pacific Railway, was reorganized. During this reorganization, Canadian Pacific Hotels and Resorts was renamed to Fairmont Hotels and Resorts, using the name of the company it had purchased in 1999. The newly re-organized Fairmont company transferred several properties to its Delta Hotels subsidiary, although it retained most of the "signature" hotels and resorts under the new Fairmont banner.

Later that year in October 2001, Canadian Pacific Limited spun off all of its subsidiary companies into separately traded "independent" companies, including Fairmont Hotels and Resorts. Companies like Fairmont Hotels and Resorts were split into smaller companies in a 2001 "starburst" move designed to increase the valuations of its individual divisions.

Fairmont Hotel and Resorts (2001–present)
In the early 2000s, Fairmont multiplied its openings in the United States. In 2001, Fairmont introduced the Willow Stream Spa prototype, a $7 million 2-floor 8,000-square-foot spa located inside the Fairmont Empress Hotel. The signature spa brand was then implemented in many of Fairmont's locations. In July 2001, Fairmont Hotels signed a joint-venture with Sheikh Khalifa bin Zayed Al Nahyan for a minority-stake purchase and the management of a luxury 393-room hotel in Dubai. The Fairmont Dubai property was the first Fairmont branded hotel in the Middle East. In 2003, Fairmont introduced Fairmont Heritage Place, a chain of timeshare hotels, with the first opening in Mexico.

In 2004, Fairmont Hotels & Resorts Inc. paid $70 million to take full control of the management company that runs its properties. Then in early 2006, a cluster of Fairmont Hotels & Resorts was sold for US$3.9 billion to Colony Capital, LLC. As a result of that purchase, Fairmont Hotels & Resorts was united with Raffles Hotels and Resorts and Swissôtel to form Fairmont Raffles Hotels International (FRHI), though the four chains still operate under their individual names.

In April 2010, Kingdom Hotels sold 22% of its shares of FRHI (from 58% to 35%) to Qatari Diar Real Estate Investment, giving them 40% of FRHI and became the second largest shareholder of the company. The remaining 60% belonged to a private shares holding in Sweden, trusted in ACCOR hotels, and other investors. The Middle East became Fairmont's new target market, where Fairmont opened in the Makkah Royal Clock Tower Hotel in 2010 and at the Palm Jumeirah in 2012. In Asia, Fairmont reopened the Peace Hotel in Shanghai in 2010, opened in Baku’s Flame Towers in 2011, and opened its first hotel in India in 2012. In the USA, Fairmont acquired the Claremont Hotel in Berkeley, California in 2014.

In 2015, AccorHotels, with the approval and support of the external party, announced the acquisition of FRHI, thus adding Raffles Hotels and Resorts, Fairmont and Swissôtel to its Luxury Hotel Brands portfolio. Acquiring Fairmont Hotels & Resorts enabled the French hotel group to gain greater access to the lucrative North American market.

In 2015, Fairmont stated it would invest in two new hotels in Egypt, in addition to its existing Fairmont hotel located in Cairo.

In 2017, Fairmont opened the Fairmont Quasar Istanbul, its first hotel in Turkey.

In 2019, Fairmont opened its first South American hotel in Brazil.

Properties
The following is a non-exhaustive list of hotels and resorts managed by company.

See also

Notes

References

External links

 Official website

 
Hotel chains in Canada
Companies based in Toronto
Hotels established in 1886
Multinational companies headquartered in Canada
Canadian brands
1907 establishments in California
2016 mergers and acquisitions
Accor